The Sandover Medal is an Australian rules football award, given annually since 1921 to the fairest and best player in the West Australian Football League.  The award was donated by Alfred Sandover M.B.E., a prominent Perth hardware merchant and benefactor.

Voting system
After each match, the three field umpires (those umpires who control the flow of the game) confer and award a 3, 2 and 1 point vote to the players they regard as the best, second best, and third best in the match respectively. Voting wasn't always done this way. From 1985-2018, 5, 4, 3, 2 and 1 point votes were given, from 1930–1984, 3, 2 and 1 point votes were given, and prior to 1930 there was only one vote per game.

Just like similar "fairest and best" awards, for example the Brownlow and Magarey Medals, if a player is suspended for a reportable offence throughout the season then they become ineligible to win the award. This in effect is where the "fairest" element of the award comes in.

On the awards night, the votes over the home and away (regular) season are tallied and the eligible player with the highest number of votes is awarded the medal. In the past, ties were decided on a countback system, but after a three-way tie in the 1984 count, the WAFC decided to scrap countback system and award multiple medals to joint winners.

Prior to 1930 when only 1 vote per game was given, and hence a countback was not possible, the WAFL president would cast a deciding vote to decide the winner.

Players that had missed out on a medal due to the countback system were awarded them retrospectively in 1997.

Sandover Medal winners

 Awarded retrospective Sandover Medal in 1997

 Voting system changed from a single vote per game to 3-2-1 voting in 1930, then to 5-4-3-2-1 voting in 1985, and back to 3-2-1 voting in 2019

 In 1987, Derek Kickett polled 46 votes, but was ineligible to win due to suspension.

§ Due to the COVID-19 pandemic, a shortened 10 game season was played

Multiple winners
The following players have won the Sandover Medal multiple times.

References 

List of Sandover Medal winners from the Official WAFL website

External links 
 Alfred Sandover Bio

Awards established in 1921
West Australian Football League
Australian rules football awards
1921 establishments in Australia